Ahasverus longulus is a species of silvanid flat bark beetle in the family Silvanidae. It is found in North America.

References

Further reading

 
 

Silvanidae
Articles created by Qbugbot
Beetles described in 1910
Beetles of North America